Street of Sinners is a 1957 American crime film directed by William Berke, written by John McPartland, and starring George Montgomery, Geraldine Brooks, Nehemiah Persoff, Marilee Earle, William Harrigan and Stephen Joyce. It was released in September 1957 by United Artists.

Plot

Cast 
George Montgomery as John Dean
Geraldine Brooks as Terry
Nehemiah Persoff as Leon
Marilee Earle as Nancy
William Harrigan as Gus
Stephen Joyce as Ricky
Clifford David as Tom
Diana Millay as Joan
Andra Martin as Frances 
Danny Dennis as Short Stuff
Ted Erwin as sergeant #1
Melvin Decker as Tiny
Lou Gilbert as Sam
Barry McGuire as Larry
Elia Clark as Boy
William Kerwin as Tom
Jack Hartley as fire captain
Billy James as Joey
Liza Balesca as Sam's wife
Eva Gerson as Tiny's mother
John Holland as Harry
Bob Duffy as motor cop
Joey Faye as Pete
Fred Herrick as sergeant #2
Charlie Jordan as customer
John Barry as utility bartender
Wolfe Barzell as Tiny's father
Stephen Elliott

References

External links 
 

1957 films
Film noir
1950s English-language films
United Artists films
American crime films
1957 crime films
Films directed by William A. Berke
Films scored by Albert Glasser
1950s American films